Annalisa Bucci (born ) is an Italian female kickboxer and mixed martial artist, based in Rimini. She has competed professionally since 2005 and is the currently competing in the Bellator Featherweight division and in the SUPERKOMBAT Lightweight division.

She is the former WAKO Kickboxing and ISKA Muay Thai World Champion.

Combat Press ranked her as a top ten MMA women's featherweight between September 2014 and January 2017.

Martial arts career

Kickboxing and Muay Thai
Annalisa Bucci made her kickboxing debut against Arianna Leonardi on the Italian regional scene, and won her first professional bout.

In 2007 she defeated Gabriella Carmelita to win an Italian National Amateur Championship.

In 2009 she scored a TKO win over Chantal Ughi to win the WMTI Intercontinental Thai Boxing Title.

Bucci won the European WAKO Pro K1 title through a decision win over Najat Hasnouni-Alaoui.

She unsuccessfully challenged Kerry Louise for the WFKKO World title, losing a unanimous decision.

She entered the 2012 WAKO European Pro Tournament. Despite defeating Dilek Yucel in the semi finals, she lost to Boglaka Brunner in the final match.

She captured the ISKA Muay Thai World Title with a decision win over Stacey Parker.

Mixed martial arts
Bucci made her MMA debut during Dangerous Zone, in 2010, winning through a first round TKO.

She lost her next two fight against Slavka Vitaly, through an armbar, and against Myriam Lamare by unanimous decision.

Over the next two years she amassed a 6-1 record, with four of those six wins ending with a finish.

She made her Bellator MMA debut in 2014, during Bellator 130, but lost in the third round by a rear naked choke.

Titles
2015 – WTKA European Muay Thai title, 66 kg
2013 – ISKA World Title, Full Contact, 64.5 kg
2011 – WAKO Pro European K1 Title
2009 – WMTI Intercontinental Thai Boxing Title, 65 kg
2007 – Italian Amateur K1 Title

Kickboxing record

|-
|-  bgcolor="#CCFFCC" 
| 2015-04-11 || Win ||align=left| Chantal Ughi ||  || Ancona, Italy || Decision (split) || 3 
|-
|- align 
! style=background:white colspan=9 |
|-
|-  bgcolor="#CCFFCC" 
| 2015-03-07 || Win ||align=left| Cristiana Stancu || SUPERKOMBAT World Grand Prix I 2015 || Ploiești, Romania || Decision || 3
|-
|-  bgcolor="#CCFFCC" 
| 2013-04-20 || Win ||align=left| Stacey Parker || World Championship Kickboxing || Stevenage, England || ? || 3
|-
|- align 
! style=background:white colspan=9 |
|-
|-  bgcolor="#FFBBBB" 
| 2015-03-22 || Loss ||align=left| Claire Musani || WMF World Championship || Bangkok, Thailand || Decision || 3
|- align 
! style=background:white colspan=9 |
|-
|-  bgcolor="#CCFFCC" 
| 2013-02-23 || Win ||align=left| Katia Currò || ? || Italy || KO || 2
|-
|-  bgcolor="#CCFFCC" 
| 2011-12-18 || Win ||align=left| Najat Hasnouni-Alaoui || KING OF THE RING || Rimini, Italy || Decision (Unanimous) || 3
|- align 
! style=background:white colspan=9 |
|-
|-  bgcolor="#FFBBBB" 
| 2010-12-29 || Loss ||align=left| Boglaka Brunner || WAKO European Championship || Ankara, Turkey || Decision (Unanimous) || 3
|-
|- align 
! style=background:white colspan=9 |
|-
|-  bgcolor="#CCFFCC" 
| 2010-12-27 || Win ||align=left| Dilek Yucel || World Championship Kickboxing || Ankara, Turkey || Decision (Unanimous) || 3
|-
|- align 
! style=background:white colspan=9 |
|-
|-  bgcolor="#CCFFCC" 
| 2009-03-25 || Win ||align=left| Chantal Ughi || ? || Milan, Italy || TKO (Doctor Stoppage) || 3
|-
|- align 
! style=background:white colspan=9 |
|-
|-  bgcolor="#c5d2ea" 
| 2007-12-28 || Draw ||align=left| Myriam Lamare || PFC 4 || Marseille, France || Decision (Unanimous) || 3
|- align 
|-
|-  bgcolor="#FFBBBB" 
| 2006-12-23 || Loss ||align=left| Kerry Louise || WFKKO || Stanley, England || Decision (Unanimous) || 3
|-
|- align 
! style=background:white colspan=9 |
|-
|- align 
|-
| colspan=9 | Legend:

Mixed martial arts record

|Loss
|align=center|7–4
|Marloes Coenen
|Submission (Rear-Naked Choke)
|Bellator 130
|
|align=center|3
|align=center|0:57
|Kansas, United States
|
|-
|Win
|align=center|7–3
|Maria Hougaard Djursaa
|Decision (Unanimous)
|European MMA 9: Mark Your Time
|
|align=center|3
|align=center|5:00
|Copenhagen, Denmark
|
|-
|Loss
|align=center|6–3
|Pannie Kianzad
|Decision (Unanimous)
|Superior Challenge 10
|
|align=center|3
|align=center|5:00
|Helsingborg, Sweden
|
|-
|Win
|align=center|6–2
|Minerva Montero
|Decision (Unanimous)
|Shooto Italy: King of the Ring 3
|
|align=center|2
|align=center|5:00
|Rimini, Italy
|
|-
|Win
|align=center|5–2
|Jasmina Nadj
|Submission (Rear-Naked Choke)
|Shooto Italy: King of the Ring 2
|
|align=center|1
|align=center|
|Rimini, Italy
|
|-
|Win
|align=center|4–2
|Angelica Babbi
|Submission (Rear-Naked Choke)
|Janus Fight Night 2012: In The Cage
|
|align=center|1
|align=center|
|Veneto, Italy
|
|-
|Win
|align=center|3–2
|Lenka Smetankova
|TKO (Punches)
|MMAA Arena 1
|
|align=center|2
|align=center|1:37
|Prague, Czech Republic
|
|-
|Win
|align=center|2–2
|Anita Torti
|Submission (Rear-Naked Choke)
|Milano in the Cage 2
|
|align=center|1
|align=center|3:50
|Milan, Italy
|
|-
|Loss
|align=center|1–2
|Myriam Lamare
|Decision (Unanimous)
|Pancrase FC 4
|
|align=center|2
|align=center|5:00
|Marsielle, France
|
|-
|Loss
|align=center|1–1
|Slavka Vitaly
|Submission (Armbar)
|MMA Italy: Strong and Unbreakable Round 1
|
|align=center|1
|align=center|4:00
|Tuscany, Italy
|
|-
|Win
|align=center|1–0
|Elisa Navalesi
|TKO (Punches)
|Dangerous Zone
|
|align=center|1
|align=center|
|Tuscany, Italy
|

See also
 List of female kickboxers
 List of female mixed martial artists

References

External links
 Annalisa Bucci at Awakening Fighters

1983 births
Italian female kickboxers
Living people
Sportspeople from Ancona
Italian female mixed martial artists
Italian Muay Thai practitioners
Female Muay Thai practitioners
Featherweight mixed martial artists
Mixed martial artists utilizing boxing
Mixed martial artists utilizing Muay Thai
SUPERKOMBAT kickboxers